Jack Alcott (born March 15th, 1999) is an American actor and model. He is known mostly for two roles on Showtime: as Jason Brown in the miniseries The Good Lord Bird and as Harrison Morgan on Dexter: New Blood.

Career
Alcott appeared in several short films before earning his first television role as Young Zach Chevalier on Champaign ILL. In 2020, he appeared as Young Donald Ressler in an episode of The Blacklist.

Alcott received his first regular role as Jason Brown on the Showtime miniseries The Good Lord Bird (2020).  He then starred as Harrison Morgan, the now-teenage son of Dexter Morgan, in the Showtime series Dexter: New Blood (2021–22).

Filmography

Personal life 
Alcott grew up in Franklin, Tennessee. He briefly lived in New York City while living the “struggling actor” life, but moved back home when the COVID-19 pandemic hit.

External links

References

1996 births
American male film actors
American male television actors
Living people
University of North Carolina School of the Arts alumni
21st-century American male actors